Arev or AREV may refer to:

Publications
Arev (daily), an Armenian newspaper in Cairo, Egypt
Arev Monthly, a monthly in Arabic published by Arev in Cairo, Egypt

Given name
Arev Petrosyan (born 1972), Armenian artist
Arev, god of the sun in Armenian mythology
Arev, an alias of the fictional character Syrran in Star Trek: Enterprise

Other uses
Assembly of European Wine-producing Regions ( in French)
Atmospheric Reentry Experimental Vehicle, an ESA study to develop a re-entry vehicle